First strike most commonly refers to:
 Pre-emptive nuclear strike
 Pre-emptive war

First strike may also refer to:
 First Strike (1996 film), also known as Jackie Chan's First Strike or Police Story 4: First Strike, an action movie
 "First Strike" (Stargate Atlantis), an episode of the TV series Stargate Atlantis
 First Strike (1979 film), a United States Air Force documentary
 First Strike, a television film made in 1984 by Allan Kuskowski
 Halo: First Strike, a 2003 science fiction novel written by Eric Nylund, based on the video game series
 First strike (coinage), the first coins struck from a new set of dies
 First Strike (DC Comics), a fictional team of superheroes by DC Comics
 First Strike (IDW Publishing), a crossover event by IDW Publishing, set in the Hasbro Universe
 First Strike (album), an album by Cobra
 Tales of Vesperia: The First Strike, 2009 film 
 1st Strike Brigade, Catterick Garrison
 First Strike (book), book by American writer Douglas Terman

See also 
 First use (disambiguation)
 First Blood (disambiguation)
 Strike (disambiguation)